Shimmei Station (神明駅) may refer to either of the following railway stations in Japan:

 Shimmei Station (Fukui) of Fukui Railway
 Shimmei Station (Hokkaido) of JR Hokkaido
 Shima-Shimmei Station of Kintetsu